Herbert Theodore Lilburne (16 March 1908 – 12 June 1976) was a New Zealand dual-code international rugby union and professional rugby league footballer who played in the 1920s and 1930s, and coached rugby union in the 1940s. He played representative level rugby union (RU) for New Zealand, South Island, North Island, Canterbury and Wellington, and at club level for Marist Albion RFC, as a Fullback, Centre, or Fly-half, i.e. number 15, or, 13 or 12, or 10, and representative level rugby league (RL), for New Zealand and Wellington as a er, i.e. number 2 or 5, and having been reinstated from rugby league in the World War II amnesty, coached club level rugby union (RU) for Zingari-Richmond Rugby Club. Following the injuries to the New Zealand (RU) captain Cliff Porter, and vice-captain Bill Dalley, Herb Lilburne was appointed captain for the first test of New Zealand's 1929 tour of Australia, at 21-years and 112-days he is the youngest New Zealand test captain to date, he died in Dunedin

Background
Lilburne was born in Burnham, New Zealand.

International honours
Herb Lilburne won caps for New Zealand (RU) in 1928 against South Africa (2 matches), in 1929 against Australia (3 matches), in 1930 against British Lions (2 matches), and 1931 against Australia, in 1932 against Australia, and in 1934 against Australia, and won a cap for New Zealand (RL) in the 8–29 defeat by Australia at Carlaw Park on 2 October 1935.

References

External links
Marist Albion Canterbury Honours

1908 births
1976 deaths
Canterbury rugby union players
Dual-code rugby internationals
New Zealand international rugby union players
New Zealand national rugby league team players
New Zealand rugby league players
New Zealand rugby union coaches
New Zealand rugby union players
North Island rugby union players
People from North Canterbury
Rugby league players from Christchurch
Rugby league wingers
Rugby union centres
Rugby union fly-halves
Rugby union fullbacks
South Island rugby union players
Wellington rugby union players
Wellington rugby league team players
Rugby union players from Christchurch